Ryan Carlyle (born November 24, 1989) is an American rugby sevens player. She was selected as a member of the United States women's national rugby sevens team to the 2016 Summer Olympics. She was in the squad for the 2013 Rugby World Cup Sevens.

She attended the University of South Carolina where she studied Sport Management and Marketing and DeVry University where she studied International Business.

References

External links 
 Ryan Carlyle at USA Rugby
 
 
 
 
 

1989 births
Living people
Female rugby sevens players
American female rugby sevens players
United States international rugby sevens players
Rugby sevens players at the 2016 Summer Olympics
Olympic rugby sevens players of the United States
University of South Carolina alumni